The Retreat at Elcot Park is the second hotel from British hospitality brand The Signet Collection, and opened in Spring 2022.

History 
The Elcot Park estate was purchased by Anthony Bushby Bacon (1772 - 1827), the son of a wealthy Welsh industrialist, from Charles Dundas, 1st Baron Amesbury, a prominent landowner from nearby Barton Court. He built the house in 1817. The gardens of Elcot Park were laid out in an English landscape style, with the area around the mansion laid to lawns with clumps of trees, woodland walks and distant views over the Kennet valley.  There also was a walled kitchen garden with a range of glasshouses, including four greenhouses for vines and peaches, and also a pine pit heated with hot water.  Elcot Park was well known in the nineteenth century for Bacon's implementation of hot water heating in the glasshouses.

When Anthony Bacon died in 1827, he was heavily in debt with two mortgages against the house. His son, Charles Bacon, bought the house in 1831 after clearing the debts, but seemed to continue to have financial difficulties as he had to sell the property in 1844.

The Shelleys

In 1844 Lady Elizabeth Shelley, the mother of Percy Bysshe Shelley, purchased Elcot and moved there from Field Place with her two unmarried daughters, Hellen and Margaret, following the death of her husband, Timothy Shelley.

 Soon after she moved there Mary Wollstonecraft Shelley visited them to discuss her son’s inheritance. Elizabeth died in 1846 and Mary continued to visit Hellen and Margaret at Elcot. A letter from Mary written at Elcot House in 1847 still exists.

Hellen was fond of her brother Percy and in 1857, while she resided at Elcot, she wrote a series of letters about her memories of their childhood together. These letters became the key sources in the many biographies that have been published about the poet.

The two sisters appeared to live very comfortably at Elcot. The Census records show that they employed at least ten servants during their residence here including a butler and footman. In 1874 the sisters left Elcot and went to live in a smaller house in Brighton.

The estate was then let for a number of years to various military families until the Shelley family sold their interest in Elcot Park to Sir Richard Vincent Sutton, 6th Baronet in 1899. Sir Richard’s main seat was Benham Park, and the land attached to Elcot at that time adjoined Benham Valence.  Elcot Park was again let for a further 25 years to a prominent JP by the name of Richard Plaskett Thomas. He ran J Thomas & Co, Tea Brokers based in Calcutta,  India. The land belonging to Elcot Park then became part of the tenancy for Elcot Farmhouse. The main mansion, parkland and outbuildings forming a separate tenancy.

During the early years of the Second World War, a Hampshire family, the Bramley Firths from Silchester, became tenants.

Hotel
Towards the end of the war, a Mrs Whitehead had taken the tenancy and it was she who first had the initiative to create a “letting residence”.  After a long fight to establish a licensed hotel, she finally gave up the struggle whilst in her late fifties. In the late 1940s the property was trading as Elcot Park Hotel & Country Club. Mrs Edith Weston bought the tenancy from Lady Helen De Crespigny in 1949 and continued trading on this basis, linking Elcot with her other family business in London, The Surrey Restaurant in Surrey St, London WC2. Mrs Weston ran it as a successful business until 1952 when it went into liquidation. The property remained empty for some ten years, until in 1967  Harold Sterne and his wife, June, took the tenancy.  They undertook a programme of development that lasted some 18 years.  Mr & Mrs Sterne were given the opportunity to purchase the property outright in 1977 and they continued the business until deciding to retire in 1987.

The hotel was purchased by a Mr Katzler and between 1987 and the end of May 1989, the hotel was further extended by the addition of 7 more bedrooms in the Mews Cottages, formerly the private accommodation of Mr Stern. As interest rates rose Mr Katzler decided to sell the property rather than continue his expansion and redevelopment plans. From June 1989 the hotel has been in company ownership and Resort Hotels added an extension giving the property a further 42 en-suite bedrooms and a health club with an indoor swimming pool, spa pool, sauna and mini-gym.  The restaurant was redecorated and extended and a new conservatory was built to replace the original one, which had been destroyed in the great storm of 1987.

Jarvis Hotels acquired the property in 1994, bedrooms and bathrooms were refurbished and a full kitchen re-fit gave the hotel the facility to host large events. In September 2001 Jarvis joined with Ramada Hotels to form Ramada Jarvis. Following the demise of Ramada Jarvis, the hotel was re-branded and traded as the Mercure Newbury Elcot Park Hotel.

The Signet Collection purchased the hotel in 2020 and carried out a comprehensive refurbishment. Renamed The Retreat at Elcot Park, the hotel re-opened in June 2022, with a ribbon cutting ceremony carried out by the Lord Lieutenant of Berkshire, James Puxley, over the Platinum Jubilee weekend. There are 55 bedrooms including three suites, named after Percy Shelley, Anthony Bushby Bacon and Sir Richard Sutton. A new spa includes an outdoor pool, indoor hydrotherapy pool, sauna, steam room, gym and treatment rooms. The Retreat has two restaurants and a Courtyard with shops and a hair and nail salon.

References

External links
 Hotel website

Hotels in Berkshire
Georgian architecture in England
Country houses in Berkshire
Country house hotels
Grade II listed buildings in Berkshire
Kintbury